Fulbourn Fen is a  biological Site of Special Scientific Interest east of Fulbourn, Cambridgeshire. It is privately owned and managed by the Wildlife Trust for Bedfordshire, Cambridgeshire and Northamptonshire.

There are ancient meadows on calcareous loam and peat which have never been intensively farmed, so they have a rich diversity of flora and fauna. Herbs in drier areas include cowslip and salad burnet, while wetter areas have tall fen vegetation.

There is access by a track from Stonebridge Lane.

There are eight separately named woods in Fulbourn Fen:

 The Cringles - north & north-east
 Moat Wood - north-west
 Thackets Wood - west
 Ansett's Wood - south-west
 Old Orchard - south
 Hancock's Wood - central
 Widow's Wood - south-east
 Old Orchard - south

and five separate meadows:

 Ox Meadow - west
 Moat Meadow - north-west - the site of the remains of Zouches Manor
 Long Fen Pasture - central
 East Fen Pasture - east
 Four Acre - south-east

Zouches Manor 
It contains the moated remains of a Saxon manor known as Zouches Manor and then Dunmowes Manor.  It was one of the Five Manors of Fulbourn and was built by Alan la Zouche, Earl of Brittany (the same family that held Ashby-de-la-Zouch in Leicestershire).

References

Wildlife Trust for Bedfordshire, Cambridgeshire and Northamptonshire reserves
Sites of Special Scientific Interest in Cambridgeshire
Fen